Bobar Radio is a Bosnian commercial radio station, broadcasting from the city of Bijeljina. It is the most popular station in the country and can also be heard in parts of neighbouring Croatia, Montenegro and Serbia.

Bobar began broadcasting 26 November 1998 and it is formatted as an Urban contemporary radio station with music shows and news. It features both music from the former Yugoslavia area, and global hits.

Frequencies
The program is currently broadcast at 11 frequencies:

 Bijeljina 
 Sarajevo 
 Banja Luka 
 Banja Luka 
 Vlašić (Bosnian mountain) 
 Doboj 
 Zvornik  
 Romanija 
 Foča 
 Mostar 
 Trebinje 
 Bihać

References

External links 
 
 Communications Regulatory Agency of Bosnia and Herzegovina
 Bobar Radio on Facebook.

See also 
List of radio stations in Bosnia and Herzegovina

Bijeljina
Radio stations established in 1998
Mass media in Bijeljina